Pak Tongjin (also Tong-jin) was the South Korean minister of foreign affairs in the 1970s. Much of his efforts involved building trade routes between the Soviet Union and non-Soviet countries through South Korea.

General references
Gwangju Uprising: The Rebellion for Democracy in South Korea
South Korea: A Country Study

References

1922 births
2013 deaths
South Korean politicians
Permanent Representatives of South Korea to the United Nations
Ambassadors of South Korea to the United States
Ambassadors of South Korea to Brazil
Foreign ministers of South Korea
Chuo University alumni